Florentius of Peterborough was a seventh-century saint and martyr.

Florentius was a Roman, and is known to history mainly through the hagiography of the Secgan Manuscript.

According to the Anglo-Saxon Chronicle manuscript E, Florentius' relics were purchased from Bonneval Abbey and moved to Peterborough Cathedral in 1013 or 1016 by Abbot Ælfsi of Peterborough.

Florentius' was venerated at Peterborough along with Cyneswith and Cyniburg. However, his feast day on 27 September might suggest that he was in reality Florentinus of Sedun, who was martyred by the Vandal persecution.

References

Medieval English saints
7th-century Christian martyrs
Year of birth unknown